A list of phenomena in syntax. 
 Anaphora
 Agreement
 Answer ellipsis
 Antecedent-contained deletion
 Binding
 Differential Object Marking
 Case
 Clitics
 Control
 Coreference
 Discontinuity
 Do-support
 Dummy pronouns
 Ellipsis
 Ergative verb
 Exceptional case-marking
 Existential clauses
 Expletives
 Extraposition
 Gapping
 Heavy NP shift
 Inverse copula sentences
 Movement paradoxes
 Negative inversion
 Non-configurational language
 Parasitic gaps
 Pied-piping
 Pro-drop
 Pseudogapping
 Raising (linguistics)
 Reciprocal (grammar)
 Reflexive pronouns
 Reflexive verbs
 Right node raising
 Scrambling
 Shifting
 Sluicing
 Small clause
 Stripping
 Subject-auxiliary inversion
 Topicalization
 Tough movement
 Unaccusative verbs
 V2 word order
 Verb phrase ellipsis
 Wh-movement

Linguistics lists
Syntax
Generative syntax